Sosnovy Bor is a rural locality (a village) in Staropetrovsky Selsoviet, Birsky District, Bashkortostan, Russia. The population was 65 as of 2010. There is 1 street.

Geography 
Sosnovy Bor is located 19 km south of Birsk (the district's administrative centre) by road. Staropetrovo is the nearest rural locality.

References 

Rural localities in Birsky District